A New Day Has Come is the seventh English-language and eighteenth studio album by Canadian singer Celine Dion, released by Sony Music on 25 March 2002 in Europe and Australia, and on 26 March 2002 in North America. It was her first new studio album since 1998's Christmas album These Are Special Times. Dion returned to the music scene after a two-year hiatus when she gave birth to her first child in 2001. She collaborated on A New Day Has Come with various producers, including Anders Bagge and Peer Åström for the first time.

A New Day Has Come garnered mostly positive reviews from the music critics, who noticed that Dion explores a "broader, more adventurous" range of pop music and "dips its toe" into modern music, particularly dance-pop ("Sorry for Love"). However, the album also contains the usual adult contemporary songs, including power ballads like "I Surrender", "Have You Ever Been in Love", and the title track. Critics also praised "Ten Days", "Goodbye's (The Saddest Word)", "I'm Alive", "When the Wrong One Loves You Right", "The Greatest Reward", and two covers: "Nature Boy" and "At Last".

A New Day Has Come became a commercial success throughout the world and entered number one in more than seventeen countries. It has sold 3.3 million units in the United States and was certified three-times Platinum by the RIAA. In Canada, after shipping 600,000 copies, the album was certified six-times Platinum. The IFPI certified it three-times Platinum for selling three million units in Europe. Overall, A New Day Has Come has sold 12 million copies worldwide.

The first single, "A New Day Has Come" was released in March 2002 and peaked inside the top ten in Canada and Europe. In the United States, it reached number twenty-two on the Billboard Hot 100 and broke the record for most weeks at number one on the Hot Adult Contemporary Tracks chart, staying on top for twenty-one weeks. The next single, "I'm Alive" was issued in August 2002 and also peaked inside the top ten in numerous European countries. The last commercial single, "Goodbye's (The Saddest Word)" was released in November 2002 and performed moderately on the charts, reaching the top forty in Europe.

Background
After the farewell millennium concert on 31 December 1999 in Montreal, Dion decided to take a break from the public scene for two years to focus on her family. On 25 January 2001, she gave birth to René-Charles Angelil, her first son. Since then, she had performed publicly only a handful of times, including 21 September 2001, when she sang a live rendition of "God Bless America" at the America: A Tribute to Heroes telethon honoring victims of the September 11 attacks, and 28 September for Montreal's companion fund-raiser, A Show for Life, singing "L'amour existe encore".

According to Dion, the album's title, A New Day Has Come, acknowledged a new chapter in her life and career. However, she was also deeply affected by the events of 11 September and wanted the words to serve as a reminder of the tragedy. "It represents my child, because I gave life," Dion said. "Obviously, it also marks my return with a new album. But a new day has also come in the lives of other people because something bad has happened, because we've lost lives, because there's a scar on our world now". Dion struggled over an appropriate image for the cover of the album, feeling that a portrait reflecting her good fortune was in poor taste. She suggested to Sony Music Entertainment that the album cover not include her picture. However, after much discussion, the photo shoot for A New Day Has Come took place in Montreal in late December 2001 with well-renowned photographer Melvin Sokolsky. On 30 and 31 January 2002 an additional photo session for the album took place in Florida, on a beach near Dion's home by the French photographer Patrick Demarchelier. The album cover for A New Day Has Come by Demarchelier was released on 28 February 2002.

René Angélil, Dion, and the Sony family began selecting prospective songs at the beginning of 2001, and on 28 August 2001 she started recording vocal tracks for nearly two dozen songs at Montreal's Piccolo Studios. Because of Dion's unwillingness to leave her seven-month-old baby, the album's collaborators traveled to Montreal. "I didn't feel the pressure to try and outdo anything," Dion said of her time in the studio. "I proved myself before, so now I can enjoy. I was relaxed, I just let go. It was such a pleasure". The album was scheduled for release internationally on 25 March 2002 and in North America on 26 March 2002.

Content

Most of the producers of the album had worked with Dion before: Walter Afanasieff, Kristian Lundin, Andreas Carlsson, Christopher Neil, Guy Roche, Robert John "Mutt" Lange, Ric Wake, Aldo Nova, Simon Franglen and Humberto Gatica. The new ones included Swedish musicians Anders Bagge, Peer Åström and Arnthor Birgisson, French singer Gérald de Palmas and the US producer Steve Morales. A New Day Has Come showcases Dion's traditional themes of love and hope. She sings ballads alongside several uptempo pop tracks and a pair of standards. The album contains sixteen tracks on the North American version and seventeen on the international editions, including "Super Love".

It features "A New Day Has Come", the title track, which for Dion represents the birth of her child but "it can mean different things for anyone who has to find strength again"; I'm Alive", "fun" and "fresh" song from the team that wrote "That's the Way It Is"; "I Surrender", the album's "bombastic, heart-pounding" ballad which has become a popular song choice for contestants on reality television singing competitions like American Idol; "Sorry for Love", a dance number written and produced by the Swedish team, co-written by Kara DioGuardi; "Have You Ever Been in Love", a power ballad also written and produced by Bagge and Åström; "Goodbye's (The Saddest Word)", an emotional ballad about the death of one's mother which Dion first heard three years prior but turned it down at that time; "Nature Boy", a 1947 song made popular by Nat King Cole that features Dion accompanied only by piano as originally foreseen symphonic orchestration was not added; "At Last", a gospel-tinged number first recorded by Glenn Miller in 1941; "Ten Days", a rock-oriented adaptation of "Tomber" (2000) by Gérald de Palmas which was recorded at the last minute after Dion heard the original French version; "The Greatest Reward", an adaptation of "L'envie d'aimer" (2000) from the French musical Les Dix Commandements, performed originally by Daniel Lévi; and "Aun Existe Amor", a Spanish-language version of Dion's French song "L'amour existe encore".

Special editions
On 11 November 2002 in Europe and 19 November 2002 in North America, Sony Music Entertainment released a Limited Edition of A New Day Has Come, which includes the original album, as well as a bonus DVD featuring the "I'm Alive" video, a preview of Dion's Las Vegas show A New Day... as well as two previously unreleased tracks, "Coulda Woulda Shoulda" and "All Because of You". The North American Limited Edition includes a longer version of "The Greatest Reward" lasting 4:04, instead of original 3:28. On 29 January 2008, Legacy Recordings released a Collector's Edition of A New Day Has Come with bonus DVD. The CD contains sixteen tracks from the North American version of the album, including an extended version of "The Greatest Reward", and the DVD features four music videos, and behind the scenes footage from making of the album and the "A New Day Has Come" video.

Promotion
Dion actively promoted the album, including various television show appearances and concerts. Her A New Day Has Come television special was taped on 3 March 2002 at the Kodak Theatre in Los Angeles and aired on CBS on 7 April 2002. During the show Dion performed "A New Day Has Come", "I'm Alive", "At Last", "Have You Ever Been in Love", "Nature Boy" and a movie medley with the songs "Because You Loved Me", "Beauty and the Beast" in duet with Brian McKnight and "My Heart Will Go On". She also sang "Aun Existe Amor" and "Goodbye's (The Saddest Word)", but both songs were not broadcast. Destiny's Child joined her to perform together the "Emotion/When the Wrong One Loves You Right" medley. On 17 March 2002 Dion taped La spéciale Céline Dion in Paris, France, to promote the album in Francophone countries. This television special was broadcast on 30 March 2002 on TF1. During the show she performed "A New Day Has Come", "Pour que tu m'aimes encore" in duet with Jean-Jacques Goldman, "Sous le vent" in duet with Garou, "Au bout de mes rêves" with Garou, Pascal Obispo, Gérald de Palmas and Jean-Jacques Goldman, "Ten Days" in duet with Gérald de Palmas, "I'm Alive", "On ne change pas" and "The Greatest Reward".

Dion along with Cher, Mary J. Blige, Shakira and the Dixie Chicks headlined the VH1 Divas Las Vegas, which was hosted by Ellen DeGeneres and held in the MGM Grand Las Vegas. The concert was broadcast live on VH1 on 23 May 2002 to benefit the VH1 Save The Music Foundation, a non-profit organization dedicated to promoting music and education programs in schools. Other special guest performers included: Anastacia, Stevie Nicks, Cyndi Lauper and Whitney Houston. Dion opened the show performing the AC/DC's hit "You Shook Me All Night Long" in duet with Anastacia. Later, she sang "A New Day Has Come" and "I'm Alive". For the finale, the divas performed a special Elvis Presley medley which included "Can't Help Falling in Love" sung by Dion. The concert was released on CD and DVD in October 2002.

On 14 September 2002 Dion performed at the charity Concert for World Children's Day, which took place at the Arie Crown Theater in Chicago and was under the supervision of David Foster. It was broadcast on ABC on 14 November 2002. She sang "That's the Way It Is", "My Heart Will Go On", "The Prayer" in duet with Josh Groban and "Goodbye's (The Saddest Word)". For the finale, Dion joined other artists to perform with them "Aren't They All Our Children". The concert was released on DVD in December 2002. On 10 October 2002, Dion taped in Paris her second television special for Francophone viewers, entitled Céline Dion à tout prix. She performed "I'm Alive", "Pour que tu m'aimes encore", "L'envie d'aimer" in duet with Daniel Lévi and "Ten Days/Tomber" medley with Gérald de Palmas. Dion also performed "Woman in Love" in duet with Natasha St-Pier and joined Lââm to sing "Stayin' Alive". The special was broadcast on 22 November 2002 on M6.

Singles
The first single, "A New Day Has Come" premiered on the radio on 6 February 2002. The music video was shot in mid-February 2002 in West Palm Beach, Florida and directed by Dave Meyers. It premiered on 13 March 2002 and the CD single was released outside the United States at the same time. "A New Day Has Come" became a top ten hit in Canada and Europe, including number seven in the United Kingdom. In the United States, it was released  as an airplay-only track, which led to its peak position on the Billboard Hot 100 at number twenty-two. However, on the U.S. Hot Adult Contemporary Tracks, the song broke the record for most weeks at number one, staying on top for twenty-one weeks.

Also directed by Meyers, the music video for next single, "I'm Alive" was filmed in late May 2002 in Los Angeles and the song was serviced to radio stations on 7 June 2002. At the same time, two remixes of "I'm Alive" premiered: Humberto Gatica Mix and The Wake Up Mix. The music video debuted on 27 June 2002. "I'm Alive" was also featured in the soundtrack for the movie Stuart Little 2 and the CD single was released in early August 2002 in Europe, Australia and Canada. The song peaked inside the top ten in various European countries which led to its number two position on the European Hot 100 Singles. In the United States, it reached number six on the Hot Adult Contemporary Tracks.

The third and last commercial single, "Goodbye's (The Saddest Word)" was released to radio on 10 October 2002. The music video was filmed in the Château d'Aunoy castle in France in mid-October 2002 and directed by Chris Applebaum. It premiered on 21 November 2002 and the CD single was released at the same time in Europe, reaching the top forty in various countries. On the U.S. Hot Adult Contemporary Tracks, "Goodbye's (The Saddest Word)" peaked at number twenty-seven.

Sony Music Entertainment also released two promotional singles in the United States: "Aun Existe Amor" and "At Last". The first one was issued after Dion performed the song at the Billboard Latin Music Awards in May 2002 where she was honoured with a special award for "My Heart Will Go On", which was the first English-language song to top Billboards Hot Latin Tracks chart. "At Last" was sent to the adult contemporary radio stations in December 2002 and peaked at number sixteen on the Hot Adult Contemporary Tracks. Although not changed, "Have You Ever Been in Love" was also included on Dion's next album, One Heart and released as a single in April 2003. The song spent fourteen weeks at number two on the Hot Adult Contemporary Tracks in the United States.

Critical reception

The album garnered generally positive reviews from music critics. Chuck Taylor from Billboard gave it a favorable review, saying that Dion explores a "broader, more adventurous" range of pop music. Among the highlights, he mentioned "Sorry for Love" where Dion "dishes out her first all-out dance anthem" and holds a twelve-second "authentic note that puts the "d" in diva", "I'm Alive" and "When the Wrong One Loves You Right", which he described as "hitworthy uptempo gems", the rock-leaning "Ten Days", and a Spanish track, "Aun Existe Amor". According to Taylor, Dion does not disappoint with ballads like the "rafter-shaking" "I Surrender" where she sings of "forbidden love amid a firestorm of utterly volcanic instrumentation" and "The Greatest Reward", and two standards – the "diamond-dipped" "Nature Boy" and gospel "At Last". He called the album the most "versatile and gratifying" Dion's recording yet. Larry Flick, also from Billboard wrote about another song, "Have You Ever Been in Love" that "at a time when music is frightfully aggressive and the world at large is fraught with turmoil, a classic Dion power ballad is a warm source of comfort". The track "builds from a gentle, piano-laced opening into a deliciously theatrical, string-framed climax". All along, Dion offers an "appealing palette of vocal colors that range from delicate and breathy to full-bodied and appropriately dramatic".

Chuck Taylor also reviewed all three singles from the album. He wrote that the life-affirming "A New Day Has Come" "comes off like a gentle exhale against the world's ills". The Ric Wake Radio Remix of "A New Day Has Come" opens with an "Enya-inspired whisper before a shuffle skips in and lifts the song upward like a dove gracefully taking flight". The Album Edit "comes sans the beat, allowing Dion's performance alone to fully color the message". According to him, on both versions Dion "embraces a particularly restrained performance – dramatic enough to steer the track's emotion, but still delicate to offer comfort". "I'm Alive" demonstrates a stylistic "left turn, with its throbbing tribal rhythms and a loose, sky-grazing vocal from Dion". The "percolating" Humberto Gatica Mix "adds juice" to the Album Version, while the uptempo Wake Up Mix, with assistance from Ric Wake and Richie Jones, is Dion's most "inspired and festive" remix to date, with Blondie's "Heart of Glass" woven into the beat to "splendid effect". Taylor criticized the choice of the third single, "Goodbye's (The Saddest Word)", a ballad relegated solely to adult contemporary radio stations. He noticed that the song is "devastatingly beautiful", offering a loving tribute to one's mother at death's door and that Dion "delivers it with a heaving helping of passion, emotionally drawing one's attention to the devotional message". Although he felt that many will connect to the loss of a parent, on a commercial level, this was a disappointing decision. According to Taylor, songs like "Sorry for Love" and "When the Wrong One Loves You Right" were primed for radio airplay and dancefloor remixes and were ideal candidates for release.

Stephen Thomas Erlewine of AllMusic gave the album three and a half out of five stars saying that its construction is "as perfect as it could be". It doesn't "deviate" from Dion's mainstream audience, yet it "dips its toe" into modern music, particularly dance, while "keeping hip" ("Nature Boy"). Although Erlewine described "Rain, Tax (It's Inevitable)" as "bizarre", he wrote that "there's really nothing to fault it on, actually," the album is "more ambitious than it needs to be, covers more stylistic territory than any other Dion record, while never abandoning the middle-of-the-road; it's a balancing act that nobody since Barbra Streisand has been able to pull off". According to Erlewine, the songs aren't "that particularly memorable", "the mood shifts effortlessly, it never seems to stay in one place," but it "never catches hold, either". Sal Cinquemani from Slant Magazine gave A New Day Has Come three out of five stars. According to him, Dion is great at what she does and "if she ever tried anything too edgy she'd probably just sound foolish". Cinquemani disliked "Rain, Tax (It's Inevitable)" but praised "Sorry for Love" on which Dion "gets the Cher treatment", an unexpected "change of pace that actually works". Among other highlights he mentioned two covers, a "soulful" rendition of "At Last" and a "simple and moving" arrangement of "Nature Boy". He also noticed that the album is "packed" with the usual adult contemporary songs: "I Surrender", a power ballad "only a singer with Dion's voice could pull off," "Ten Days", the guitar-driven "catchy pop-rocker with a surprisingly edgy vocal," "Goodbye's (The Saddest Word)", a track featuring Shania Twain on backing vocals that "will leave you nauseous or in tears", "I'm Alive", the "uplifting" midtempo number and "A New Day Has Come", the "stirring" title track.

Ken Tucker of Entertainment Weekly gave the album B−. He felt that A New Day Has Come was "over-arranged" by producers, which works "against Dion's enthusiasm for the wonders of babies and innocence". Nevertheless, he praised the "jaunty disco" of "Sorry for Love", and "Have You Ever Been in Love" which "builds in intensity to sound like "a James Bond movie theme as delivered by Barbra Streisand". Tucker described "Rain, Tax (It's Inevitable)" as the most "idiosyncratic" and "idiomatic" song that Dion has ever recorded. According to the positive review from Mike Ross of Jam!, A New Day Has Come "picks up where Falling into You left off". Dion's album is a full of "bombast, melodrama and soaring love ballads indistinguishable from anything she's ever done". Attempts at modernity are "spotty", though "welcome". Ross noticed that ballads are the strongest tracks on the album and praised "Goodbye's (The Saddest Word)", with "two soaring key changes" in the same song, which is then launched into a "high Earth orbit of melodrama by an orchestra that would make John Williams blush with envy". Barnes & Noble also gave the album favorable review and wrote that the new songs reveal a more "spiritual" and "edgier" Dion. They praised the "uplifting" title track, "heartfelt, country-tinged" "Goodbye's (The Saddest Word)", "anthemic, gospel choir-accented ballad" "Prayer", "bluesy, honky-tonk rocker" "Ten Days", "soaring ballad" "Have You Ever Been in Love", and "solid renditions" of "Nature Boy" and "At Last".

Commercial reception
A New Day Has Come debuted at number one in 17 countries around the world. Dion earned two career achievements with the debut of A New Day Has Come in the United States. It became her first album to open at number-one on the Billboard 200 –  her fourth number-one overall – and it set a personal best for first-week sales (558,000 units). Previously, 1997's Let's Talk About Love sold 334,000 in its first week, while 1999's All the Way... A Decade of Song opened with 303,000. The 558,000 tally became Dion's third largest one-week total, following 640,000 units of All the Way ... A Decade of Song and 624,000 copies of Let's Talk About Love, both during Christmas periods. In the second week, A New Day Has Come fell to number two selling 263,000 copies. It stayed there for another week with sales of 226,000 units. For the next two weeks, A New Day Has Come occupied the number three position and sold 163,000 and 114,000 copies respectively. In the sixth week, it fell to number six selling 101,000 units and in the seventh week it climbed to number two with 143,000 copies sold. A New Day Has Come spent ten weeks inside the top ten on the Billboard 200. On the list of best selling albums of 2002 in the United States, it reached number 12 with sales of 2,645,000 units. In January 2003, it was certified three-times Platinum by the RIAA and as of 5 December 2010, it has sold 3,307,000 copies in the United States.

In Canada, A New Day Has Come debuted at number-one, selling 151,600 copies — more than ten times her nearest competition, Shakira's Laundry Service (12,200). It stayed at number-one for seven straight weeks marking Dion's longest run at number-one, beating the six-week reign of The Colour of My Love. It was certified six-times Platinum by the CRIA. A New Day Has Come topped the charts in most European countries and was certified Multi-Platinum, Platinum and Gold. After selling three million copies in Europe and spending seven weeks at number-one on the European Top 100 Albums, it was certified three-times Platinum by the IFPI. Billboard ranked A New Day Has Come as the 3rd Top Album of 2002 in Europe (behind Shakira's Laundry Service & Anastacia's Freak of Nature). A New Day Has Come also peaked at number-one in Australia and New Zealand and was certified two-times Platinum in both countries.

The album entered number one in more than seventeen countries, becoming the biggest debut of 2002. The commercial success of A New Day Has Come led to its fifth position on the list of best selling albums of 2002, according to the IFPI. It has sold 12 million copies worldwide.

Accolades

In 2003, Dion won the American Music Award for Favorite Adult Contemporary Artist and was nominated for Favorite Pop/Rock Female Artist. She also won a Billboard Music Award for Hot Adult Contemporary Artist and was nominated for Top Pop Catalog Artist and Hot Adult Contemporary Track ("A New Day Has Come"). Dion also won the following awards: Félix Award for Artist of the Year Achieving the Most Success in a Language Other Than French, IFPI Hong Kong Top Sales Music Award for Best Selling Foreign Release (A New Day Has Come), Arion Music Award for Best Selling International Album (A New Day Has Come) and Dragon Award for International Female Artist of the Year. "A New Day Has Come" also won ASCAP Pop Award and BMI Pop Award for Most Performed Song, and three SOCAN Awards in categories: Pop Music, International Achievement and Classic Songs. Dion was also nominated for four Juno Awards of 2003, including: Artist of the Year, Fan Choice Award, Album of the Year (A New Day Has Come) and Single of the Year ("A New Day Has Come"). Nominations for other awards include: People's Choice Award for Favourite Female Musical Performer, Echo Award for International Female Artist of the Year and MuchMoreMusic Award for "A New Day Has Come" music video.

Track listing

Notes
  signifies an additional producer

Personnel
Adapted from AllMusic.

Walter Afanasieff – arranger, bass, drum programming, keyboards, producer, programming
John Amatiello – digital editing, pro-tools
Magnus Anderson – assistant engineer
Fredrik Andersson – string engineer
Jim Annunziato – engineer
Peer Åström – digital editing
Anders Bagge – arranger, engineer, producer, background vocals
Janie Barnett –  background vocals
Tom Bender – mixing assistant
Francis Benítez –  background vocals
Dushyant Bhakta – engineer
Kevin Breit – engineer, acoustic guitar, electric guitar
Arnthor Birgisson – producer
Terry Britten – guitar
Chris Brooke – assistant, assistant engineer, engineer, mixing assistant
Marcus Brown – bass, drums, keyboard programming, percussion
Jorge Calandrelli – conductor, orchestral arrangements, piano
Andreas Carlsson – guitar, producer, background vocals
Jennifer Carr –  background vocals
Sue Ann Carwell –  background vocals
Dorian Cheah – electric guitar
Chiquito – assistant engineer
Sébastien Chouard – guitar
Christian B. – producer, programming
Kevin Churko – engineer, pro-tools
Datz Pyle – orchestra contractor
Rich Davis – production coordination
Matthew Dellapolla – scoring consultant
Lenny DeRose – engineer
Joey Diggs –  background vocals
Celine Dion – liner notes, primary artist, background vocals
Peter Doell – engineer, recording
Margaret Dorn –  background vocals
Felipe Elgueta – engineer, synthesizer programming
Mark Eshelman – scoring crew
Keith Fluitt –  background vocals
Peter Fogselius – mixing assistant
Kevin Fox – cello
Simon Franglen – arranger, keyboards, producer, synthesizer programming
Michel Gallone – assistant, assistant engineer
Humberto Gatica – arranger, engineer, mixing, mixing engineer, producer, vocal engineer
Gavin Greenaway – string arrangements, string conductor
Mary Griffin –  background vocals
Rutger Gunnarsson – string arrangements, string conductor
Mick Guzauski – mixing
Nana Hedin –  background vocals
Dan Hetzel – engineer
Simon Hurrell – engineer, track engineer
Paul Jackson, Jr. – guitar
Henrik Janson – string arrangements, string conductor
Uli Janson – string arrangements, string conductor
Skyler Jett –  background vocals
Richie Jones – drum programming, guitar, producer
Steven Kadison – assistant, mastering assistant
Chantal Kreviazuk – guest artist, background vocals
Eric Kupper – guitar, keyboard programming
Michael Landau – guitar
Robert John "Mutt" Lange – guitar, producer, background vocals
Thomas Lindberg – bass
Jason Lloyd – scoring crew
Bernard Löhr – mixing, string engineer
Kristian Lundin – keyboards, mixing, producer, programming
Vito Luprano – executive producer, producer
Nick Marshall – assistant engineer
Vladimir Meller – compilation mastering, mastering
Chieli Minucci – guitar
Steve Morales – arranger, MIDI programming, producer, background vocals
Maryanne Morgan –  background vocals
Pablo Munguia – assistant engineer
Christopher Neil – producer
Aldo Nova – producer
Kenny O'Brien – vocal arrangement, vocal editing, background vocals
Esbjörn Öhrwall – guitar
Jeanette Olsson –  background vocals
Rafael Padilla – percussion
Richard Page –  background vocals
Woody Pornpitaksuk – compilation editing
Mark Portmann – arranger, keyboards
Steve Prestage – engineer
Dave Reitzas – engineer
Claytoven Richardson –  background vocals
Guy Roche – arranger, drum programming, producer, synthesizer
Maggie Rodford – string coordinator
William Ross – conductor, orchestral arrangements, string arrangements
Mark Russell – production coordination
Sakai –  background vocals
Denis Savage – assistant engineer, vocal engineer
Dave Scheuer – engineer
David Siegel – keyboards
Harry "Slick" Sommerdahl – piano
Tony Stanton – copyist
Stockholm Session Orchestra – strings
Shane Stoner – engineer
Christian Szczesniak – acoustic guitar
Nick Thomas – engineer
Shelene Thomas –  background vocals
Michael Hart Thompson – guitar
Shania Twain –  background vocals
Ric Wake – producer
Dan Warner – guitar (acoustic), guitar (electric)
Sam Watters –  background vocals
Patrick Weber – stage technician
Yvonne Williams –  background vocals
Joe Wohlmuth – digital editing
Nick Wollage – string engineer
Jennifer Young – assistant engineer

Charts

Weekly charts

Monthly charts

Year-end charts

Decade-end charts

All-time charts

Certifications and sales

Release history

See also

2002 in British music charts
List of best-selling albums by women
List of Billboard 200 number-one albums of 2002
List of European number-one hits of 2002
List of fastest-selling albums
List of number-one albums from the 2000s (Denmark)
List of number-one albums from the 2000s (New Zealand)
List of number-one albums of 2002 (Australia)
List of number-one albums of 2002 (Canada)
List of number-one hits of 2002 (Italy)
List of number-one singles of 2002 (France)
List of Top 25 albums for 2002 in Australia
List of UK Albums Chart number ones of the 2000s

References

External links
 

2002 albums
Albums produced by Aldo Nova
Albums produced by Christopher Neil
Albums produced by Guy Roche
Albums produced by Humberto Gatica
Albums produced by Ric Wake
Albums produced by Robert John "Mutt" Lange
Albums produced by Walter Afanasieff
Celine Dion albums